The 2004–05 Essex Senior Football League season was the 34th in the history of Essex Senior Football League, a football competition in England.

League table

The league featured 15 clubs which competed in the league last season, no new clubs joined the league this season.

Additionally, Bowers United merged with Pitsea, renaming to Bowers & Pitsea, whilst Brentwood renamed to Brentwood Town.

League table

References

Essex Senior Football League seasons
9